The term mambises refers to the guerrilla Cuban independence soldiers who fought against Spain in the Ten Years' War (1868–78) and Cuban War of Independence (1895–98). The term is found applied in different history texts to any person who fought for independence during the wars of independence including soldiers of Chinese, American, African, and Spanish origin.

Origin of the term

According to the noted Cuban Historian Carlos Márques Sterling, the word "Mambí" is of Afro-Antillan origin and was applied to revolutionaries from Cuba and Santo Domingo (now Dominican Republic) in the 19th Century. According to the fiction writer Elmore Leonard, in his adventure novel Cuba Libre, the word Mambí comes from Eutimio Mambí, a leader who fought the Spaniards in Santo Domingo 50 years previously. 

The surviving Spanish soldiers, who had been fighting in Santo Domingo, were then sent to Cuba once the Ten Years' War broke out in 1868. These soldiers, noting the similar tactics and machetes use by the Cuban independence fighters as by the original “men of Mamby”, began calling the Cuban independence fighters mambises. Though this was meant as a racial and derogatory slur towards the Cuban rebels, the Cubans accepted and started using the name with pride.

Other sources cite the term to be of Congo origin or, as stated by Esteban Montejo in Biography of a Runaway Slave, mambí refers to the child of a monkey crossed with a buzzard.

Background

The mambí soldiers made up most of the National Army of Liberation and were the key soldiers responsible for the success of the Cuban liberation wars. They consisted of Cubans from all social classes including free black people, slaves, and mulattos. It is thought that about 92-95% of the black population fought as mambises in both the Ten Years' War and War of Independence. During the Ten Years' War the slaves were promised their freedom if they assisted the Creoles in the fight against the Spanish. The freeing of slaves to help fight was started by Carlos Manuel de Céspedes. At the end of the war, even though independence from Spain was not achieved, Spain agreed to honor the freeing of the slaves who had fought against them.

The mambí forces were made up of volunteers who mostly had no military training and banded together in loose groups who acted independently to attack the Spanish troops during the Ten Years' War. Even with these limitations, the mambises made up for it with their cunning, fierceness, and bravery. It is estimated that 8,000 poorly armed and underfed mambises inflicted close to 20,000 casualties on the well-trained Spanish soldiers during the Ten Years' War.

Similarly, by the end of the War of Independence the National Army of Liberation numbered nearly 50,000 of which only about 25,000 were armed. The leaders, having learnt from previous mistakes, had organized the army into “6 corps with 14 divisions, 34 brigades, 50 regiments of infantry and 34 cavalry.” Even though, once again, they were limited on resources, their bravery and cunning made it possible to inflicting 71,000 casualties* out of the 250,000 Spanish troops sent to the island.
 Total number of Spanish casualties lost during conflict. Number lost due to yellow fever and other diseases vs. combat is not known.

Women

Mambí independence fighters were not limited to men. During the War of Independence, Spanish general General Valeriano Weyler Nicolau instigated the infamous "Reconcentración" which forcefully moved rural inhabitants into the cities in makeshift concentration camps. Conditions in these camps resulted in mass starvation, disease, and large numbers of deaths of the Cuban population. The prospect of these conditions pushed many families, including the women and children, into joining the fight for freedom.

During the War of Independence women served in typical roles as nurses and cooks but are also recorded as partaking in the fighting while some went so far as to be officers in the military. Though it did probably occur, there is no documented history of women taking part in the fighting during the Ten Years' War.

The best known mambí woman is Mariana Grajales Coello, who was Antonio Maceo Grajales’s mother. Mariana and all of her sons participated in all three of the wars of independence. She was often known to go into battles to aid wounded soldiers from both sides. In the camps, Mariana ran the hospitals and was responsible for supplies. She has been upheld as the epitome of the self-sacrificing nationalistic Cuban woman.

Weapons

Prior to the Ten Years' War, private ownership of weapons was allowed but, considering that at this time many of the black were still slaves, most of the men who became mambises did not have firearms. Following the war, Spain prohibited ownership of firearms in an effort to prevent another uprising. In both cases, the lack of firearms forced the mambises into using what they had: machetes and sometimes horses.

At the start of the Ten Years War Máximo Gómez, who had been a cavalry officer in the Spanish Army, taught the men the "machete charge". This became the mambises' most useful and feared tactic in both wars. These methods resulted in Guerrilla type warfare that favored them due to the element of surprise and their knowledge of the terrain and environment.

Knowing additional weapons were needed, numerous attempts were made to procure arms from outside the country. Approximately 45 attempts were made to bring weapons and supplies in from outside the country. Of these, only one attempt is known to have succeeded while the rest were seized by the United States or Spain. Despite this interference, and having only originally started with a small number of weapons, the mambises were able to build up a significant arsenal by conducting raids on the Spanish troops and strongholds.

Notable Mambises

Antonio Maceo Grajales: Is considered one of the greatest mambises and military commanders of the National Army of Liberation for both wars of independence. The Mambí Army was led by Antonio Maceo, the Bronze Titan, until his death on December 7, 1895.

Quentin Bandera: Was a black military officer under Maceo. He played key role in leading of the Mambí Army after the death of Antonio Maceo. Bandera continued the struggle for freedom and independence of Cuba during the United States occupation.

Henry Reeve: An American, who upon hearing about the revolution, traveled to Cuba to help. He moved through the ranks, became a Brigadier General, and was instrumental in the success of many battles. Reeve spent most of his time fighting alongside the mambises and has been bestowed the honor of being called a mambí.

Carlos Manuel de Céspedes: Though not considered a mambí, Cespedes was a Cuban planter who freed his slaves and made the declaration of Cuban independence in 1868, which started the Ten Years' War. His actions helped bring the black slaves into the war who then became the mambises.

1959 Revolution/Comandos Mambises

The Comandos Mambises were a secret group operating after the Cuban Revolution who were named after the fighters of the Cuban War of Independence.

Contemporary reference to Mambises

To this day, Cubans hold the mambises in extremely high regard as an important piece of their cultural history as well as the ideal example of people who live up to contemporary Revolutionary ideals. Many political speeches in Cuba refer to the mambises as the source of their freedom based on how they represent noble self-sacrifice for the fatherland, a fierce determination to be recognized as sovereign citizens, and fighting for freedom and independence regardless of the odds and the sacrifices. With no training, no pay, few weapons, little food, and small numbers, the mambises gained their independence against all odds.

A Gasparilla Krewe in Tampa, Florida is named the "Krewe of Mambi" to honor the intertwined history of Tampa and Cuba.

In film

Elpidio Valdés: is a notable cartoon character within Cuban culture in comics, television, and movies . Created in 1970, he is portrayed as a mambí colonel, fighting for the liberation of Cuba from the Spanish. Elpidio Valdés is used as a role model for the children because he represents an authentic expression of the ideal character of Cuban nationality

Several films have been made in Cuba, both before and after the 1959 Revolution, that portray the national significance of the mambises. These cinemas have been used to create a sense of Cuban national identity. One such film, El Capitán Mambí y Libertadores o guerrilleros, which was made before the Revolution, was funded by the government and had all of the troops, horses, and weapons for the film supplied by the military. 

Jose Gomez-Rivera superhero graphic novel entitled “ Captain Mambise “ is an anti-Castro story using Cuban and African mythology to develop a story depicting a hero who gets his powers from Cuban heroes and Lukumi Orishas against Castro and his supernatural allies.

Notes

References
"A secret war: The clandestine campaign waged by the Kennedy Administration and the CIA against Fidel Castro in the years that followed the Bay of Pigs invasion rivaled open warfare in time, effort and money spent," by Don Bohning, in the Miami Herald: 
"Guide to the Rafael Martínez Pupo Papers Relating to Comandos Mambises" from the University of Florida Libraries
Moreno Fraginals, Manuel, "Cuba-España, España-Cuba Historia común". Grijalbo Mondadori. Barcelona, 1995 . 
Emilio de Diego García, Weyler, de la leyenda a la Historia. Fundación Cánovas del Castillo, Madrid, 1998. 
Gabriel Cardona y JuanCarlos Losada, "Weyler, nuestro hombre en La Habana" . Planeta, Barcelona, Segunda edición 1988. 
Perinat Mazeres,Santiago, "Las Guerras Mambisas".Ediciones Carena,Barcelona,2002. 

Spanish colonial period of Cuba